The following is a list of Christian Church Fathers. Roman Catholics generally regard the Patristic period to have closed with the death of John of Damascus, a Doctor of the Church, in 749. However, Orthodox Christians believe that the Patristic period is ongoing. Therefore, the list is split into two tables.

Until John of Damascus

After John of Damascus

See also
 Ante-Nicene Fathers (book)
 Apostolic Fathers
 Cappadocian Fathers
 Church Fathers
 Desert Fathers
 Doctors of the Church
 List of early Christian writers
 Nicene and Post-Nicene Fathers
 Patristics
 Patrologia Graeca
 Patrologia Latina
 Patrologia Orientalis
 Three Holy Hierarchs

Notes and references

External links
Fathers of the Church (Catholic Encyclopedia)
Monachos Patristics Master List
Writings of Church Fathers from NewAdvent

 
Christianity in late antiquity
Church Fathers
Chu